Akcent is a Romanian dance pop group whose members sing in Romanian, English and Spanish. Their name originated as a wordplay on accent. Originally a duo, it consisted of Adrian Sînă and Ramona Barta. They released their debut album  in 2000. Except for the first track, "", which received some airplay, the album was a commercial failure and the duo disbanded shortly after. Sînă brought Marius Nedelcu, Mihai Gruia and Sorin Brotnei into the group, changing it from a duo to a boyband in 2001. They came to prominence with the single "" in their native Romania.

Their single "Kylie" was commercially successful in Europe. In 2006, they attempted to represent Romania at the Eurovision Song Contest with the single "Jokero", in collaboration with Romanian singer Nico. It became their first number-one single on the Romanian Top 100. Due to several conflicts, Sînă became the sole member of the project in 2013.

Early years 

Born and raised in Baia Mare, Maramureș, Adrian Sînă formed the band in 1998. At that point the group consisted of just him and singer Ramona Barta. The two sent their debut single to nationwide mainstream radio stations as early as 1999. The song  "" ("The last summer") reached the top-twenty of many airplay charts. The duo also released a studio album titled  (The Sensation). The album did not do well and Barta split from Sînă.

The duo changed into a boyband when Sînă introduced Marius Nedelcu, Mihai Gruia and Sorin Brotnei to the group. Their debut album  (In colors) was released in Romania on January 10, 2002 and included the hit single "". They rose to fame instantly when "" ("I promised you") reached the peak of the Romanian Top 100 in winter 2001. It became one of the most successful albums in the country's recent history. It received a Gold certification within three weeks. During this time, the group won multiple MTV Romania Music Awards as well.

Continued success 
In 2003, the band released their third studio album, 100 BPM. Its title refers to the intensity of heartbeat during a kiss. It included their number-one single "" ("Bouquet of roses"). Their fourth album,  (Life story) was also a huge success for the band. It included hits like " (Hey baby!)" ["Tell me (Hey baby!)"]. They reached the peak of their success with the release of their studio album S.O.S. and its lead single "" ("Love for rent"). It became their signature song and hit number-one in Romania, both digitally and in airplay. Due to its success, the song was re-written in English and released to the international market as "Kylie" (an ode to Kylie Minogue). It became a radio hit in countries like Turkey, the Netherlands, Belgium, France, Greece and Ukraine. Akcent's debut English album French Kiss with Kylie was released in Europe on August 23, 2006, and it included their two hit singles, "Kylie" and "Jokero".

In April 2008, Marius Nedelcu left the band to go solo. The remaining three members called in Corneliu Ulici, a former member of another Romanian group, Bliss. However, Corneliu did not want to make music his career and left after only five months, after which Akcent officially became a trio. Adrian Sînă was commissioned to produce Akcent's album  (No Tears). The international hit singles "That's My Name", "Stay with Me" and "Lover's Cry" were all produced by Sînă. In 2009, he also produced the True Believers album, which has been one of Akcent's most successful to date. The album included the hits "That's My Name", "Stay with Me," "Lover's Cry" and "Tears". In the same year, Akcent won the Balkan Music Award for "Best Duet or Group". Because of the success of "That's My Name," the song along with "Stay with me" was released through U.S. record label Ultra Records, Warner Music Group in Scandinavia, Turkey, Italy, Greece and other countries. The single was also included on the Just Dance: Vol 3 compilation album released by The Island Def Jam Music Group in 2010. After this multi-platinum album, the band started performing worldwide.

The new decade 
In 2011, Akcent signed a recording contract with Robbins Entertainment, and in May 2012 "My Passion" was officially released in the United States. Then came the song "Feelings on Fire", which featured Ruxandra Bar and a music video that was filmed with the band members driving sports cars in Romania, on Transfagarasan. Sînă also became a judge of X Factor the same year. 2012 was a busy and successful year for Akcent with touring and more hits. In January, the group released the single "I'm Sorry" featuring pop singer Sandra N. The single was later licensed to Disco Wax Records and distributed by Sony Music Entertainment in the United Kingdom, Finland and Denmark. Several of Akcent's singles have been added to dance compilations and/or released singularly off of different major recording labels including Warner Music Group, Universal Music Group and Ministry of Sound.

In the northern-hemisphere summer of 2012, Akcent released the single "" ("Chemistry between us"), produced by Sînă. In September 2012, the group embarked on a U.S. tour, performing sold out shows in New York City, New York and Chicago, Illinois. Akcent signed with Shakir Entertainment Management in New York City on November 26, 2012. As of December 2012, the group's music videos and songs on YouTube had been viewed close to 1 billion times, and they had more than 3 million fans on Facebook. Akcent is the only international pop act to perform live in Pakistan several times within the past two years.

2013–2014: Disbandment and lasting success 
In September 2013, the band split after a quarrel, leaving Sînă as the only member of the band.

As of September 2013, Adrian Sînă was the only male artist with the most chart entries on the Romanian Top 100. Overall, only artists like Madonna or Rihanna had more entries than him. In 2014, he saw immense success with the songs "Kamelia" and "Faina". In 2015, he released the successful singles "Te Quiero" ft. Galena and "Amor Gitana" ft. Sandra N. In 2016, he released the album Love the Show. He has remained loyal to the original style of Akcent. Meanwhile, Sorin Brotnei and Gruia Mihai started their own band, "Two."

Discography

Albums

Extended plays

Compilations

Singles

Other charted songs

Member timeline

Notes

References

Sources
 Click! (in Romanian). 11 December 2013

External links 
 http://akcentonline.com/
 http://www.adriansina.com/ 
 Akcent signs with U.S management 
 KHNC Top 89 of 2012 New Years Eve coundtown

Romanian pop music groups
Romanian boy bands
Romanian Eurodance groups
Eurodisco groups
Musical groups established in 1999
1999 establishments in Romania